Bowery Daze is a 1934 short animated film distributed by Columbia Pictures. The film is one of the many animated adaptations featuring Krazy Kat who started out as a comic strip character.

Plot
Krazy is a bartender of a tavern on the street of Bowery. He serves his patrons by filling their mugs with lager from barrels.

When the pianist of the place is done playing, Krazy conducts for an orchestra to play some music. As the music plays, a stage act featuring dancing ladies takes place. The dancing ladies are fronted by none other than Krazy's spaniel girlfriend. Krazy's act is followed by one featuring a bass singer walrus singing a melancholy song.

Moments later, while Krazy and the spaniel are at a table chatting, a fat Onion Johnny comes in. The Onion Johnny takes the spaniel, and dances with her regardless of what she thinks. Krazy, who is a bit bothered, intervenes. When Krazy and the spaniel pummel at the Onion Johnny, the patrons hurl glassware around before going into a brawl. Eventually the spaniel restrains the Onion Johnny in a corset.

See also
 Krazy Kat filmography

References

External links
Bowery Daze at the Big Cartoon Database

1934 short films
American animated short films
American black-and-white films
1934 animated films
Krazy Kat shorts
Columbia Pictures short films
1930s American animated films
Films set in New York City
Films set in New York (state)
Columbia Pictures animated short films
Screen Gems short films